Helen Bright may refer to:
 Helen Bright Clark (1840–1927), British women's rights activist and suffragist
 Ellen Blight (1833–1850), English lion-tamer killed by a tiger